Yao Gaitor (2 March 1960) is a former boxer, who represented Togo at the 1984 Summer Olympics.

Gaitor competed in the bantamweight contest at the 1984 Summer Olympics in Los Angeles, but he lost on points in the first round against Finnish boxer Jarmo Eskelinen.

1984 Olympic results
Below is the record of Yao Gaitor, a Togolese bantamweight boxer who competed at the 1984 Los Angeles Olympics:

 Round of 64: lost to Jarmo Eskelinen (Finland) by decision, 0-5

References

1960 births
Living people
Togolese sportsmen
Boxers at the 1984 Summer Olympics
Place of birth missing (living people)
Olympic boxers of Togo
Bantamweight boxers
21st-century Togolese people